San Pedro de Tutule is a municipality in the Honduran department of La Paz.

Demographics
At the time of the 2013 Honduras census, San Pedro de Tutule municipality had a population of 6,939. Of these, 91.73% were Mestizo, 7.91% Indigenous (7.83% Lenca), 0.20% White and 0.17% Black or Afro-Honduran.

References

Municipalities of the La Paz Department (Honduras)